Eraserheads Anthology Two is a compilation album by Filipino alternative rock band Eraserheads. It was released in 2006 by Sony BMG Music Entertainment & Musiko Records in the Philippines. It features several tracks from their studio albums, as well as two bonus tracks from the 1994 album Circus and the non-album track "Casa Fantastica", first featured in the 1996 compilation album 1896: Ang Pagsilang. The album was first released in a two-disc set.

Track listing

References

Eraserheads albums
2006 compilation albums